Big Bang Theory most commonly refers to:

The Big Bang, a cosmological model of the universe
The Big Bang Theory, an American TV sitcom

It may also refer to:

Music
 Big Bang Theory (song), Barenaked Ladies (2007) themesong to the U.S. TV sitcom, see The Big Bang Theory#Theme song
 Big Bang Theory (Styx album) (2005)
 Big Bang Theory (Harem Scarem album) (1998)

Other uses
 "The Big Bang Theory" (Family Guy), a 2011 episode of the TV series

See also
 Big Bang (disambiguation)